Tritonville Road, Sandymount, Dublin 4, is connected to Lansdowne Road by both Herbert Road and Newbridge Avenue. At its southern end, it meets Serpentine Avenue. The northern side of Tritonville road is considered to be part of Irishtown by the locals even though the postcode is Sandymount.

The street takes its name from the Tritonville baths, established by the Cranfield family in the late 18th century; these were in turn named after the sea-god Triton.

In Ulysses, the funeral of Paddy Dignam passes along here and continues on to Glasnevin Cemetery via Irishtown.

See also

List of streets and squares in Dublin

References

Streets in Dublin (city)
Sandymount
Irishtown, Dublin